Richard Cartwright may refer to:

Richard Cartwright (Loyalist) (1759–1815), businessman, judge and political figure in Upper Canada
Sir Richard John Cartwright (1835–1912), Canadian Member of Parliament and Senator
Richard Cartwright (bishop) (1913–2009), Bishop of Plymouth in the Church of England
Richard Cartwright (philosopher) (1925–2010), American philosopher
Richard Cartwright (murderer) (1974–2005), executed in Texas in 2005